The Dorilton is a luxury residential housing cooperative on the Upper West Side of Manhattan, New York City, built from 1900 to 1902.

Architecture 
The building was designed by Janes & Leo, the New York City-based architectural firm of Elisha Harris Janes and Richard Leopold Leo, for real estate developer Hamilton M. Weed. It is located at 171 West 71st Street, at Broadway. The building is noted for its opulent Beaux-Arts style limestone and brick exterior, featuring monumental sculptures, richly balustraded balconies, and a three-story, copper and slate mansard roof. The exterior masonry, decorative terra-cotta work and chimneys and roof were expertly restored in 1998 by the Walter B. Melvin architectural firm.

Architecture historian Andrew Dolkart regarded the Dorilton as "the most flamboyant apartment house in New York," with its striking, "French-inspired" sculpted figures and an enormous iron gate "reminiscent of those that guard French palaces." Architecture historian Francis Morrone considered it one of the city's great apartment buildings. The building was designated a New York City landmark in 1974. It was added to the National Register of Historic Places in 1983.

Gallery

References

External links 

Residential buildings on the National Register of Historic Places in Manhattan
Beaux-Arts architecture in New York City
Residential buildings completed in 1902
Condominiums and housing cooperatives in Manhattan
Upper West Side
Broadway (Manhattan)
Residential buildings in Manhattan
New York City Designated Landmarks in Manhattan